Sunstruck, also known by the alternative title of Education of Stanley Evans, is a 1972 British–Australian comedy film directed by James Gilbert and starring Harry Secombe, Maggie Fitzgibbon and John Meillon.

Plot
Stanley Evans, a Welsh schoolteacher, is very proud of the choir that he's formed with his pupils. But when the girl of his dreams – a new gym teacher – marries a fellow teacher, he decides to leave and migrate to Australia for a better life 'in the sun'.

From Sydney, he is assigned to a small school in the dead-end town of Kookaburra Springs, living in a small room over the local hotel run by Sal and Mick. All the kids live in farms throughout the district.

Homesick, and constantly playing recordings of his original school choir, he decides to form a choir of his new pupils, who haven't been taking him seriously and play pranks on him.

Mick secretly decides that the kids should enter a schools choir competition in Sydney, and when the application is accepted, Stan has only a few weeks left to train the group. They travel by bus to Sydney accompanied by Shirley, a feisty young lady who has taken a shine to Stan. But Shirley's brother doesn't want his sister involved with 'a fat little Welsh Pom', and makes clear his feelings to Stan before they leave.

The choir win a special commendation.

On his return, Stan marries Shirley.

Cast
 Harry Secombe – Stanley Evans (final film role)
 Maggie Fitzgibbon – Shirley Marshall
 John Meillon – Mick Cassidy
 Peter Whittle – Pete Marshall
 Dennis Jordan – Steve Cassidy
 Dawn Lake – Sal Cassidy
 Bobby Limb – Bill
 Norm Erskine – Norm
 Jack Allen – Banjo
 Roger Cox- Ben
 Tommy Mack – Gunboat
Derek Nimmo
Stuart Wagstaff – announcer

Production
The film was inspired by a poster used by the New South Wales government to attract teachers from Britain, where a teacher wearing swimmers and an academic board stands on Bondi Beach. It was designed as a vehicle for Harry Secombe and was shot near Parkes in New South Wales from January 1972. The budget mostly came from United States and British sources, with $100,000 from the Australian Film Development Corporation.

The pupils seen acting at choir practice in the early part of the film were from Afon Taf High School in Troedyrhiw.  The choir recorded the entire choral soundtrack at the school and it was used in both the Welsh and Australian sequences.  The beginning of the film used locations in two Welsh mining villages; Treharris and Trelewis near Merthyr Tydfil.  The name of the school is Webster Street School, Treharris which has since been demolished for housing.

Release
The film did not perform particularly well commercially or critically.

Bibliography
 Readle, Eric. History and heartburn: the saga of Australian film, 1896–1978. Associated University Presses, 1981.

References

External links

Sunstruck at Australian Screen Online
Sunstrucl at Oz Movies

1972 films
Australian comedy films
1972 comedy films
Films about educators
British comedy films
Films set in New South Wales
1970s English-language films
1970s British films